Prockiopsis is a genus of flowering plants belonging to the family Achariaceae.

It is native to Madagascar.

The genus name of Prockiopsis is in honour of Christian Leberecht von Prøck (1718–1780), a Danish baron. He served as Governor-General of the Danish West Indies colonies from 1756–1766. It was first described and published in Bull. Mens. Soc. Linn. (Paris) Vol.1 on page 573 in 1886.

Known species
According to Kew:
Prockiopsis calcicola 
Prockiopsis grandis 
Prockiopsis hildebrandtii 
Prockiopsis orientalis 
Prockiopsis razakamalalae

References

Achariaceae
Malpighiales genera
Plants described in 1886
Endemic flora of Madagascar